Chenwei  is a term that refers to prophecy books and "evening threads"  that reflect a mystical version of Confucianism. This form of literature was common in China during the Han Dynasty.

"Chen" means "prophecy" or "sign", and it refers to the writings of the arts of witchcraft and alchemy of the Qin and Han dynasties. These writings refer to the secret principles of ominous and catastrophic omens, which developed over time into a popular cult of idolatry and divination that took place in ancestral temples and Daoist temples, and from there went from abstraction to reading bamboo sticks common even today.

"Wei"  is a literature that evolved from giving far-reaching interpretations to the Confucian classics of the Han dynasty. After the reign of Emperor Guang Wu of the Eastern Han dynasty, the term "internal learning" stuck with them, but these writings were originally called "external learning".

It is a cryptic word made up by shamans and alchemists in the Qin and Han Dynasties to  foretell good and bad fortune. Later, the folk developed in Sìmiào or Taoist temples to ask gods for divination, and gradually it was simplified to Kau chim.

Chenwei studies are also used to predict a political future as in the Revolutionary Kanbun theory.

Overview 
In the Book of Sui, "Jingji Zhi 1," it is stated that

Chenwei, which was popular in Korea, was often combined with the five yin and yang events of astronomy, feng shui, divine Buddha, Taoism, and vice versa. was the most closely related.

History 

The Han Dynasty was the most prosperous period of prophecy, a mixture of theology and vulgar scripture. Confucian scholars were fond of strange powers and gods, and were fond of talking about disasters and auspiciousness, often using natural phenomena to attach the misfortunes of people, especially in the late Western Han and the late Eastern Han period.

At the end of the Western Han Dynasty, the doctrine of Fudan was prevalent and later became the basis for Wang Mang's establishment of a new dynasty. As early as the Western Han Dynasty, Confucian scholars believed in the yin and yang doctrine of "the end of the five virtues", saying that "the cycle of heaven's fortune is unpredictable, the nobility and the inferiority are unpredictable" and that "the Han dynasty will end and a new king will rise".

At the time of Han Chengdi, a Qi man  fraudulently created , saying, "When the Han family meets the great end of heaven and earth, it will be commanded by heaven again, and the emperor of heaven sent the real man Chiejingzi down to teach me this path. Gan Zhongke's disciples  and others told Emperor Ai of Han that the Western Han Dynasty was in decline and should be reordained. Then Emperor Ai of Han changed his name to Taichu Yuanzhong and was called 'Emperor Chen Sheng Liu Taiping'. When the prophecy did not come true, Emperor Ai of Han then executed  and others.

At the end of the Western Han Dynasty, some people also questioned the theory of Yin-Yang. Yang Xiong wrote Fayan after the Analects of Confucius and Tai Xuan after the Book of Changes, proposing the doctrine of "Xuan" as the root of all things in the universe, emphasizing the realistic understanding of natural phenomena, and arguing that "what has life must have death, and what has a beginning must have an end", refuting the doctrine of Fang Shi. He argued for the restoration of Confucianism's Five Classics to its original form, and set the precedent for exegesis in the Eastern Han Dynasty, which focused on the truthfulness of the text itself.

The prophecy theory reached its peak in the new Mang period. Wang Mang advocated the ancient system, and also used the prophecy theory to gain the throne. Under the guise of talisman and auspicious auspiciousness, he forged the basis for the concession, such as making a stone tablet "reporting An Han Gongmang as the emperor", and the "Golden Chamber God" book proclaiming that Wang Mang is the true son of the emperor. The demise of Xinmang represented the demise of the Confucianist ideology of retro, and also made the political theory of Han Confucianism reform and conceit disappeared, and gradually changed to the idea of the unification of emperors for all ages. Pre-Qin academics focused on correcting social ills and establishing a world of great harmony. Because of the failure of Wang Mang's reforms, it shows that the way of reforming ancient etiquette and law is unreasonable. After the Wei and Jin Dynasties, the trend of thought did not seek answers from the overall interests, but instead sought the meaning of human nature and survival, and metaphysics and Buddhism replaced the ideological status of the pre-Qin scholars.

Rumors of the fall of Baekje 
The Baekje Fallen Kingdom Confession (百濟亡國讖言) was a prophesy of the destruction of the kingdom that occurred in Buyeoseong, the royal capital, in the 20th year of King Uija of Baekje.

According to this visitation, there were several bad portents of the ruined kingdom in the year that Baekje fell. Among them, in June, a ghost came into the palace and cried out loudly, "Baekje is destroyed," and went into the ground.  So the king had a hole dug, and when it was about three feet deep a tortoise came out. There was an inscription on its back, saying, “Baekje is like a round moon, and Silla is like a crescent moon” (百濟同月輪, 新羅如月新). It will be full" and he was killed. It is said that some people reversed it and made the king happy by saying, "The round moon prospers and the new moon fades, which means Baekje prospers and Silla falls."This is the first true prophecy that predicted the destruction of the kingdom, and at that time, there was already a fortune-telling technique to decipher the oracle bones such as turtles, and there were experts to interpret them, and it shows that the interpretation had a great influence on the public mind.

Rumors of the fall of Goguryeo 
The Goguryeo Secret (高句麗秘記) is a reference book that predicted the fall of Goguryeo.

In 668 (27th year of King Gujo of Goguryeo), when King Gojong of Tang raised an army to conquer Goguryeo and advanced to Yodong, Sieosa Gaeonchung told Gojong that he would surely win this battle and destroy Goguryeo. As one of the reasons he put forward, he heard the Bigi of Goguryeo , which said, "In less than 900 years, the 80th general will destroy Lee (Goguryeo)." Ga Eon-chung unraveled this secret, saying that it must have been that the year was the 900th anniversary of Goguryeo's complete independence from the Han Dynasty, and that the Tang army's grand commander, Lee Se-jeok, was 80 years old in that year.

Rumors of the destruction of Silla 
The truth of the fall of Silla (新羅亡國讖言) refers to various prophecies that predicted the fall of Silla and the rise of Goryeo in the last years of Silla. 

One of Silla's true sayings is that of Choi Chi-won (崔致遠), which is said to be "Gyerim (鷄林) is Hwangyeop (黃葉), and Gokryeong (鵠嶺: refers to Songak, the capital of Goryeo) is Cheongsong (靑松). )," and it is considered to be a forgery of writers Choi Chi-won who participated in the founding of Goryeo.

The other is Wang Chang-geun Gyeongmun (王昌瑾鏡文), which predicted the fall of Silla, the misfortune of Gung-ye, and the fortune of Wang Geon. ) and others deciphered the contents, but it is said that they responded appropriately because they were afraid of Gungye.

Wang Chang-geun Gyeongmuncham 
Wang Chang-geun Gyeongmuncham (王昌瑾鏡文讖) was written in a mirror written on a mirror that Chinese merchant Wang Chang-geun bought in the market place of Cheorwon, the royal castle of Taebong, in the 2nd year of King Gyeongmyeong of Silla (918). It is a true gate that predicted the collapse of Taebong and Taebong and the rise of Goryeo.

The writing on the mirror side reads, “When the Sangje put his son on the horse, he will kill the chicken first, and then the duck. It was hidden, and one was shown in black gold copper.” Wang Chang-geun presented this mirror to Gung-ye, the king, and Gung-ye ordered Ham-hong Song (宋含弘), Baek Tak (白卓), and Heo Won (許原) to interpret it. Hamhong Song and others wrote the text and said to each other, "It means that King Gungye will rise from Cheorwon and soon perish.  However, it is said that they did not report the truth because they were afraid of Gungye's brutality and promiscuity.

See also 
 Nihon Shoki

References

 安居香山、中村璋八編『重編緯書集成』（明徳出版社、1971年）

Religious Confucianism
Prophecy
Concepts in Chinese folk religion
Relationship between Heaven and Mankind